Pablo Hernández (born 1 November 1944) is a Cuban gymnast. He competed in eight events at the 1964 Summer Olympics.

References

External links
 

1944 births
Living people
Cuban male artistic gymnasts
Olympic gymnasts of Cuba
Gymnasts at the 1964 Summer Olympics
Place of birth missing (living people)
Gymnasts at the 1967 Pan American Games
Medalists at the 1967 Pan American Games
Pan American Games silver medalists for Cuba
Pan American Games medalists in gymnastics
20th-century Cuban people
21st-century Cuban people